Stefan Mazrocis (born 18 April 1967) is a Dutch-English former professional snooker player. He was born of Latvian and English parentage, and spent his early life in Leicester, England.

Career 
Mazrocis turned professional in 1991. In 1995, he qualified for the main stages of the World Championship at the Crucible Theatre, defeating Lee Walters, Martin Dziewialtowski, Jason Prince, Scott MacFarlane and Mark Bennett; drawn against incumbent champion Stephen Hendry in the last 32, he lost 3–10. He was a quarter-finalist at the 1996 Asian Classic.

In 1997, he qualified for the main stages of the World Championship, defeating Scott Rigg, Jason Wallace, Karl Payne, Jason Weston and Chris Small in qualifying, and was drawn to play Peter Ebdon in the first round. On this occasion, Mazrocis won 10–3, to reach the last-16 stage for the first time. His next opponent was Alain Robidoux; Mazrocis lost 9–13.

With this performance, Mazrocis rose to 65th in the world rankings, but he slipped back in the ensuing four years and lost his professional status in 2001 when ranked 122nd.

Having regained his professional status for 2008/2009 by winning the EBSA International Open in 2008, he defeated Chris McBreen and David Roe before losing to Barry Pinches in the third qualifying round of the 2008 Bahrain Championship.

Mazrocis' attempt to qualify for the World Championship in 2009 resulted in a 9–10 defeat to Tony Knowles in his first match.

Performance and rankings timeline

Career finals

Minor-ranking finals: 1

Non-ranking finals: 2 (1 title)

Pro-am finals: 3 (3 titles)

Amateur finals: 8 (6 titles)

References

External links 
 Profile on globalsnooker.co.uk
 Profile on worldsnooker.com (2008)

1967 births
Living people
Dutch snooker players
People from Maasdriel
Dutch people of English descent
Dutch people of Latvian descent
People from Blaby
Sportspeople from Leicestershire
Sportspeople from Gelderland